Sanjeev Kumar is an Indian politician. He is a member of the 17th Lok Sabha, representing Kurnool constituency of Andhra Pradesh. He is member of the YSR Congress Party.

References 

Living people
YSR Congress Party politicians
India MPs 2019–present
Lok Sabha members from Andhra Pradesh
Andhra Pradesh politicians
1967 births